Tout est pardonné could refer to:
 All Is Forgiven (film): A 2007 French film
 The phrase on the cover of the Survivors' issue of Charlie Hebdo after the Charlie Hebdo shooting.